Cap'n O. G. Readmore (invented by Puppet Studio) was the fictional character host of the American television anthology series ABC Weekend Specials during the 1980s. He was an anthropomorphic cat puppet, dressed in a nautical outfit, that encouraged children to read for pleasure. He hosted the show from 1984 through 1989, performing with guest stars including Vincent Price, Harry Blackstone Jr., Pat Morita, Joan Lunden and others.

The character also appeared in animated form in a series of ABC Weekend Specials, including Cap’n O. G. Readmore's Puss in Boots and Cap'n O. G. Readmore Meets Dr. Jekyll and Mr. Hyde. In these features, he was the president of an all-feline book club, the Friday Night Book Club, who often found himself physically pulled into the story he's reading.

The voice of the character was provided by the American voice actor Frank Welker in the original public service announcements and while hosting the ABC Weekend Special. However, in several of the animated specials, such as Cap'n O. G. Readmore Meets Dr. Jekyll and Mr. Hyde, his voice was provided by Neil Ross. Many of the regular characters had fanciful names, such as Lickety Page, a Madam Mim-inspired witch named Calypso La Rose, a Count Chocula-inspired vampire named Vitack, who runs an organization called Villains Agency as its headmaster, and Kitty Literature. Production was by ABC Entertainment in association with Rick Reinert Pictures of Burbank, California. All these specials were directed and produced by legendary animator Rick Reinert (Winnie the Pooh and a Day for Eeyore).

List of shorts

Home media
Four of the Cap'n O. G. Readmore episodes were made available on Beacon Home Video in 1990; these copies are very rare and hard to find. The Chicken Little episode, made in 1992, has seen no official release on any video formats in North America. ABC Home Video released the first three episodes in 1993, which were all out-of-print since. The Dr. Jekyll and Mr. Hyde episode was released on VHS by Anchor Bay Home Entertainment in 1998 and is also out-of-print. As of 2020, there are currently no plans for any of the Readmore episodes to be distributed on DVD, but all of the episodes surfaced on DVD in South Korea.

Inspiration
The feline character Cap'n Readmore was drawn on as a source of inspiration when choosing a middle name for Dewey Readmore Books.

References

External links
Little Red Riding Hood on YouTube
Chicken Little on YouTube
Jack and the Beanstalk on YouTube
Dr. Jekyll and Mr. Hyde on YouTube
Puss In Boots on Dailymotion
TV Commercial at RetroJunk

Readmore, O. G.
Television characters introduced in 1984
Puppets
ABC Weekend Special